The Sauce is the first solo release of Eddie Spaghetti of the American rock and roll band The Supersuckers.  It is a collection of country drinking songs released in 2003 on Mid-Fi Records.

Track listing
The Best Of All Possible Worlds (K. Kristofferson)
Bottom Dollar (B. Shaver/D. Finley) 	
Sleepy Vampire (E. Spaghetti) 	
Gotta Get Drunk (W. Nelson) 	
Misery & Gin (John Durrill/Snuff Garrett) 	
Little Ol’ Wine Drinker, Me (Mills/Jennings) 	
I Don’t Want To Lose You Yet (S. Earle) 	
Sea Of Heartbreak (Paul Hampton/Hal David) 	
Cocaine Blues (T. J. Arnall) 	
Killer Weed (E. Spaghetti) 	
Peace In The Valley (Love/Love/Thompson/Tonin) 	
Blue Shadows On The Trail (R. Newman)

Quotes
According to Mr. Spaghetti, the album showcases his "impeccable song choices and uncanny ability to sing the drinking songs for drinkers who like to drink the drinks."

External links
Official Supersuckers webpage
Supersuckers Discography

2003 debut albums